Ernst Joseph Nordgren, born 16 November 1947 in Örebro, is a Swedish physicist.

Nordgren graduated as a B.Sc. from Uppsala University in 1971 and received his Ph.D. in physics in 1977. In 1979 he was made docent and since 1988, he is a professor of soft X-ray physics at Uppsala. Since 1 July 2008 Nordgren is vice rector for the area of science and engineering at Uppsala university.

Nordgren is a member of the Royal Swedish Academy of Sciences since 1996, and was a member of the Nobel Committee for Physics from 2001 to 2009, and the Committee's chairman in 2008 and 2009. He is also a member of the Royal Society of Sciences and Letters in Uppsala since 1981 and of the Royal Society of Sciences in Uppsala since 2005.

References

External links 
Joseph Nordgren's web page at Uppsala University

Swedish physicists
Academic staff of Uppsala University
Members of the Royal Swedish Academy of Sciences
1947 births
Living people